Cashore is a surname. Notable people with the surname include:

John Cashore (born 1935), Canadian United Church minister and former politician
Kristin Cashore (born 1976), American writer
 William Cashore, Scripps National Spelling Bee champion